Karthik Jayaram is an Indian actor in the Kannada film industry. He is known for his work in the Colors Kannada television soap opera Ashwini Nakshatra, in which he played actor Jay "JK" Krishna. He also acted in Siya Ke Ram as Raavana in Star Plus. His first role as a lead actor came in Just Love. He was second runner-up in the 2017 reality show Bigg Boss Kannada 5.

Television
Karthik appeared in a television soap, Ashwini Nakshatra. In 2015, he was signed to play the role of Ravana in the mythological Hindi television series Siya Ke Ram that would be aired on Star Plus. He entered the reality show Bigg Boss Kannada 5. He finished as second runner-up.

Filmography

References

External links
 

Male actors from Bangalore
Male actors in Telugu cinema
Indian male film actors
Male actors in Kannada cinema
1979 births
Living people
21st-century Indian male actors
Indian male television actors
People from Chikkamagaluru district
Male actors in Kannada television
Male actors in Hindi television
Bigg Boss Kannada contestants